The Muppets Mayhem is an upcoming comedy musical series based on The Muppets by Jim Henson and developed by Adam F. Goldberg, Bill Barretta, and Jeff Yorkes, for ABC Signature and The Muppets Studio. The series stars Lilly Singh, Tahj Mowry, Saara Chaudry and Muppet performers Barretta, Peter Linz, Eric Jacobson, Matt Vogel, David Rudman, and Dave Goelz.

The Muppets Mayhem is set to be released on Disney+.

Synopsis
Junior A&R executive Nora must deal with the madness caused by Dr. Teeth and the Electric Mayhem, who come face-to-face with the modern musical business as they try to record their first-ever platinum album.

Cast
 Lilly Singh as Nora
 Tahj Mowry as Gary "Moog" Moogwski
 Saara Chaudry as Hannah
 Anders Holm as JJ

Muppet performers
 Bill Barretta as Dr. Teeth
 Peter Linz as Lips
 Eric Jacobson as Animal
 Matt Vogel as Floyd Pepper
 David Rudman as Janice
 Dave Goelz as Zoot

Production

Development
On February 7, 2022, it was reported that ABC Signature and The Muppets Studio were developing a 10-episode series based on The Muppets for Disney+. Titled The Muppets Mayhem, the series will be written by Muppet fan Adam F. Goldberg alongside Muppet performer and writer Bill Barretta and Jeff Yorkes; the series is the first to be developed by Goldberg for ABC following his deal with the studio in 2019. The decision to develop a series based on Dr. Teeth and the Electric Mayhem came from the success of a series of music videos on the Muppets' YouTube channel. The series was greenlit shortly before its announcement, after finalizing deals with the Muppet performers. Goldberg and Barretta will also executive-produce alongside Michael Bostick, Kris Eber, and The Muppets Studio executives David Lightbody and Leigh Slaughter, while Yorkes will be a co-executive-producer.

Writing
Writers for the series include Julie Bean, Hannah Friedman, Crystal Shaw, Hans Rodionoff, Gabrielle Rodriguez, and Danielle Maransky. According to executive producer Kris Eber, the filmmakers approached the series as if it was a 5-hour-long feature film.

Casting
Along with the series' announcement, it was reported that Lilly Singh will portray Nora, a junior executive struggling with the chaos caused by The Electric Mayhem. Muppet performers Barretta, Peter Linz, Eric Jacobson, Matt Vogel, David Rudman, and Dave Goelz are also set to reprise their roles as Electric Mayhem members Dr. Teeth, Lips, Animal, Floyd Pepper, Janice, and Zoot, respectively. On April 5, 2022, it was confirmed that Tahj Mowry joined the cast. On June 9, 2022, Saara Chaudry and Anders Holm joined the cast.

Filming
Production for The Muppets Mayhem began on April 25, 2022, and ended on August 5, 2022.  Craig Kief serves as director of photography. Matt Sohn and Kimmy Gatewood will direct episodes. On July 2, 2022, it was reported that an accident took place in which a crew truck crashed into a tree on the edge of a cliff near the Griffith Observatory.

Release
The Muppets Mayhem is set to be released on Disney+.

References

2020s American musical comedy television series
American television shows featuring puppetry
Disney+ original programming
English-language television shows
Improvisational television series
The Muppets television series
Television series reboots
Television series based on singers and musicians
Upcoming comedy television series
Television series by ABC Studios